Igor Nikonov (born June 20, 1964, Tashkent, Uzbekistan) – Ukrainian businessman, stockholder, the head of the Kyiv City State Administration of Vitaliy Klychko, the first deputy of the KCSA head in 2014–2015. In 2001 he founded the development company KAN Development. In 2012, he founded private Educational Institutions A +.

Biography 

Born July 20, 1964, in Tashkent, the Uzbek SSR in the family of the military serviceman.

In 1966, the family moved to the city of Aleksandria, Kirovohrad region.

In 1986, he graduated from the Leningrad Institute of Railway Transport Engineers. Specialty: civil engineer. According to the postgraduate work assignment was sent to "Kievmetrostroy", where being a student has entered the labor force as a shaftman.

In the 1990s, worked in various gas projects. In particular, in the corporation "Republic". Served as a commercial director of "Intergas" company.

Public activity 

On June 6, 2014, Igor Nikonov was appointed the head of the advisors group to the Kiev mayor Vitaliy Klychko.

From July 22, 2014, to December 7, 2015, he is the first deputy of the KCSA head Vitaliy Klychko. He coordinated three areas: economy, finance and transport.

Received on the hold position, salary was transferred to charity.

On August 20, 2014, the Cabinet of Ministers awarded the third rank of a civil servant to him.

Professional activity 

In 2001, he founded the company "KAN Development". Nowadays "KAN Development" is a real estate development company that is at the head of partner enterprises group involved in the delivery of real estate projects of various scales and complexity levels. KAN construction portfolio includes: shopping and entertainment centers Ocean Plaza, Respublika Park, IQ Business Center and 101 Tower. Residential complexes Tetris Hall, Comfort Town, Fayna Town, Respublika. KAN Development has created more than 3 million square meters of residential and commercial real estate. 

2012 – created a network of educational institutions A +. This is the largest private network of educational institutions in the capital, located on the territory of KAN Development residential complexes. It includes 10 institutions where 2,000 children study. Among them: Academy Ecoland, Kindergarten A +, Academy of Sports A +, Academy of Primary Education A + with in-depth study of foreign languages, Gymnasium A +, Respublika Kids, etc.

Since the end of 2015, he is the Honorary President of the company.

"KAN Development" was recognized at the Developer of the Year Award more than 10 times (including Choice of 2015, Choice of 2016, CP Awards, EEA Real Estate Awards, IBuild Award etc.). The company's projects have been recognized by professional communities at the national and international level more than 20 times (including MAPIC Awards, European Property Awards etc.).

The name of Igor Nikonov has repeatedly appeared in informal discussions of candidates for the post of Prime Minister and Minister of Economy and Development of Ukraine. Igor Nikonov did not confirm his readiness to head the Government.

State 

Igor Nikonov is among the richest people in Ukraine:

 2021 – participant in the ranking of the 100 richest people in Ukraine according to Focus magazine (№ 97 on the list, $ 145 million).
 2020 – participant in the ranking of the 100 richest people in Ukraine according to Focus magazine (№ 66 on the list, $ 125 million).
 2019 – participant in the ranking of the 100 richest people in Ukraine according to Focus magazine (№ 73 on the list, $ 110 million).
 2018 – participant in the ranking of the 100 richest people in Ukraine according to Focus magazine (№ 53 on the list, $ 131 million).
 2016 – participant in the ranking of the 100 richest Ukrainians according to Focus magazine (No. 99 on the list, the state is $30 million).
 2014 – participant in the ranking of the 100 richest Ukrainians according to Focus magazine (No. 94 on the list, the state is $111 million).

Family 

He is married. His wife is Ivanna Nikonova.

They have 10 children.

Hobby 

Plays golf, tennis, cycling and Nordic walking. Supports biathlon, tennis and golf tournaments. 

Plays debertz. Loves music, plays piano and guitar.

Ranks and awards 

In 2012 Igor Nikonov won the "Man of the Year 2012" in the nomination "Businessman of the Year".

On January 22, 2014, Igor Nikonov was awarded the title of "Honored Builder of Ukraine by Presidential Edict".

References

External links 
 Igor Nikonov's Facebook page
RBK "Igor Nikonov, KAN Development: Everyone in the world strives for water and cities only benefit from this"
Interfax-Ukraine "Founder of KAN Development Igor Nikonov: When choosing any solution, the interests of the resident are in the first place"
Forbes Ukraine “So far there is no better alternative in Ukraine than real estate”. Where is the founder of KAN Development Igor Nikonov investing?
 

1964 births
Living people
People from Kirovohrad Oblast
Politicians from Kyiv
21st-century Ukrainian businesspeople